The 2011 Wyoming Cavalry season was the team's twelfth season as a football franchise and first in the current Indoor Football League (IFL). One of twenty-two teams competing in the IFL for the 2011 season, the Wyoming Cavalry were members of the Intense Conference. Led by head coach Dan Maciejczak, the team played their home games at the Casper Events Center in Casper, Wyoming.

Schedule
Key:

Roster

Standings

References

External links
Wyoming Cavalry official website
Wyoming Cavalry official statistics
Wyoming Cavalry at Casper Star-Tribune
2013 IFL regular season schedule

Wyoming Cavalry
Wyoming Cavalry seasons
Wyoming Cavalry